The Type 91 Air-to-Ship Missile (91式空対艦誘導弾, ASM-1C) is an Air-to-ship missile developed in Japan.

An air-launched variant of the SSM-1, the ASM-1C is carried by Japan Maritime Self-Defense Force P-3C Orions and their successor, the Kawasaki P-1.

External links 
 ASM-1

Anti-ship missiles of Japan
Anti-ship cruise missiles
Type 88